The Chapel of St. Edward was a Roman Catholic parish church under the authority of the Roman Catholic Archdiocese of New York, located in Warwick, Orange County, New York. The parish was established in 1887 and closed in 2007.

References 

Religious organizations established in 1887
2007 disestablishments in New York (state)
Roman Catholic churches in New York (state)
Churches in Orange County, New York
Closed churches in the Roman Catholic Archdiocese of New York
Closed churches in New York (state)
1887 establishments in New York (state)
Roman Catholic chapels in the United States